This is a list of fauna observed in the U.S. state of Utah.

Invertebrates

Arachnids

American grass spider (Agelenopsis spp.)
American yellow sac spider (Cheiracanthium inclusum)
Ant spider (Micaria pasadena)
Ant spider (Micaria rossica)
Antmimic spider (Meriola decepta )
Arizona bark scorpion (Centruroides exilicauda)
Banded orb weaving spider (Argiope trifasciata)
Bindweed gall mite (Aceria malherbae)
Black hairy scorpion (Hadrurus spadix)
Bold jumping spider (Phidippus audax)
Camel spider (Eremobates spp.)
Carolina wolf spider (Hogna carolinensis)
Cat-faced spider (Araneus gemmoides)
Cellar spiders (Pholcus phalangioides) - also called "daddy long-legs"
Clover mite (Bryobia praetiosa)
Crab spider (Bassaniana utahensis)
Crab spider (Ebo pepinensis)
Crab spider (Mecaphesa spp.)
Crab spider (Xysticus discursans)
Crab spider (Xysticus emertoni)
Crab spider (Xysticus pellax )
Eastern parson spider (Herpyllus ecclesiasticus)
False black widow (Steatoda grossa)
Flattened crab spider (Philodromus histrio)
Flattened crab spider (Philodromus imbecillus)
Flattened crab spider (Philodromus spectabilis)
Giant desert hairy scorpion (Hadrurus arizonensis)
Ground spider (Cesonia gertschi)
Ground spider (Drassodes spp.)
Ground spider (Drassyllus lepidus)
Ground spider (Gnaphosa sericata)
Ground spider (Herpyllus cockerelli)
Hobo spider (Tegenaria agrestis)
Huntsman spider (Olios giganteus)
Jumping spider (Habronattus conjunctus)
Jumping spider (Habronattus signatus)
Jumping spider (Habronattus tarsalis)
Jumping spider (Platycryptus arizonensis)
Jumping spider (Salticus peckhamae)
Northern scorpion (Paruroctonus boreus)
Pseudoscorpion (various)
Red spider mite (Tetranychus urticae) - also called "two-spotted spider mite"
Rocky Mountain wood tick (Dermacentor andersoni)
Sac spider (Phrurotimpus borealis)
Salt Lake County brown tarantula (Aphonopelma iodius)
Slender crab spider (Tibellus chamberlini)
Slender crab spider (Tibellus duttoni)
Soft-bodied tick (Ornithodoros spp.) - suspected due to confirmation in all surrounding states, not confirmed in Utah
Spinose ear tick (Otobius megnini)
Spruce spider mite (Oligonychus ununguis)
Striped lynx spider (Oxyopes scalaris)
Tomato russet mite (Aculops lycopersici)
Utah crevice weaver (Kukulcania utahana)
Western black widow spider (Latrodectus hesperus)
White-banded crab spider (Misumenoides formosipes)
Wolf spider (Hogna spp.)
Woodlouse spider (Dysdera crocata)

Crustaceans

Brine shrimp (Artemia franciscana)
Louisiana crayfish (Procambarus clarkii) - not native and considered invasive
Northern crayfish (Orconectes virilis) - not native and considered invasive
Pill bug (Armadillidium vulgare) - sometimes called "sow bugs"
Pilose crayfish (Pacifastacus gambelii)
Signal crayfish (Pacifastacus leniusculus) - confirmed in Utah County
Snake River Pilose crayfish (Pacifastacus leniusculus) - likely but not confirmed as of 2009
Water flea (Daphnia lumholtzi) - not native and considered invasive

Insects

Alkali fly (Ephydra hians)
American serpentine leafminer (Liriomyza trifolii)
Bank's grass mite (Oligonychus pratensis)
Beet leafhopper (Circulifer tenellus)
Brine fly (Ephydra cinerea Jones)
Brown marmorated stink bug (Halyomorpha halys) - considered invasive
Cabbage aphid (Brevicoryne brassicae)
Cabbage maggot (Delia radicum)
Colorado potato beetle (Leptinotarsa decemlineata)
Columbia Basin wireworm (Limonius subauratus)
Common earwig (Forficula auricularia) - also called European earwig
Coral Pink Sand Dunes tiger beetle (Cicindela albissima)
Corn leaf aphid (Rhopalosiphum maidis)
Corn sap beetle (Carpophilus dimidiatus)
Differential grasshopper (Melanoplus differentialis)
Dusky sap beetle (Carpophilus lugubris)
Four-spotted sap beetle (Glischrochilus quadrisignatus) - also called picnic beetle
Great Basin wireworm (Ctenicera pruinina)
Green lacewing (Chrysopa)
Green peach aphid (Myzus persicae)
Green stink bug (Chinavia hilaris)
Ichneumon wasp (Megarhyssa spp.)
Jerusalem cricket (Stenopelmatus spp.)
Melon aphid (Aphis gossypii)
Migratory grasshopper (Melanoplus sanguinipes)
Mormon cricket (Anabrus simplex)
Northern corn rootworm (Diabrotica barberi)
Onion fly (Delia antiqua)
Onion thrips (Thrips tabaci)
Pacific coast wireworm (Limonius canus)
Potato aphid (Macrosiphum euphorbiae)
Potato psyllid (Bactericera cockerelli)
Red-legged grasshopper (Melanoplus femurrubrum)
Seedcorn maggot (Delia platura)
Spotted cucumber beetle (Diabrotica undecimpunctata)
Striped cucumber beetle (Acalymma trivittatum)
Thrips (various)
Sugar beet wireworm (Limonius californicus)
Two-striped grasshopper (Melanoplus bivittatus)
Vegetable leafminer (Liriomyza sativae)
Velvet ant (Mutillidae spp.) - these are actually a type of wasp
Water boatmen (Corixidae)
Western corn rootworm (Diabrotica virgifera)
Western field wireworm (Limonius infuscatus)
Western honey bee (Apis mellifera)

Butterflies and moths

Achemon sphinx moth (Eumorpha achemon)
American painted lady butterfly (Vanessa virginiensis)
American snout butterfly (Libytheana carinenta)
Anise swallowtail butterfly (Papilio zelicaon)
Aphrodite fritillary butterfly (Speyeria aphrodite)
Arctic fritillary butterfly (Boloria chariclea)
Army cutworm (Euxoa auxiliaris)
Black cutworm (Agrotis ipsilon)
Black swallowtail butterfly (Papilio polyxenes)
Bordered patch butterfly (Chlosyne lacinia)
Cabbage looper (Trichoplusia ni)
California patch butterfly (Chlosyne californica)
California sister butterfly (Adelpha californica)
California tortoiseshell butterfly (Nymphalis californica)
Callippe fritillary butterfly (Speyeria callippe)
Clodius parnassian butterfly (Parnassius clodius)
Common buckeye butterfly (Junonia coenia)
Compton tortoiseshell butterfly (Nymphalis vaualbum)
Corn earworm (Helicoverpa zea) - also called the tomato fruitworm
Coronis fritillary butterfly (Speyeria coronis)
Diamondback moth (Plutella xylostella)
Dotted checkerspot butterfly (Poladryas minuta)
Edith's checkerspot butterfly (Euphydryas editha)
Edward's fritillary butterfly (Speyeria edwardsii)
Empress Leilia butterfly (Asterocampa leilia)
Fall armyworm (Spodoptera frugiperda)
Field crescent butterfly (Phyciodes pulchella)
Five-spotted hawkmoth (Manduca quinquemaculata)
Freija fritillary butterfly (Boloria freija)
Glassy cutworm (Crymodes devastator)
Gorgone checkerspot butterfly (Chlosyne gorgone)
Gray comma butterfly (Polygonia progne)
Great Basin fritillary butterfly (Speyeria egleis)
Great spangled fritillary butterfly (Speyeria cybele)
Green comma butterfly (Polygonia faunus)
Gulf fritillary butterfly (Agraulis vanillae)
Hackberry emperor butterfly (Asterocampa celtis)
Hoary comma butterfly (Polygonia gracilis)
Hydaspe fritillary butterfly (Speyeria hydaspe)
Indra swallowtail butterfly (Papilio indra)
Leanira checkerspot butterfly (Chlosyne leanira)
Lorquin's admiral butterfly (Limenitis lorquini)
Milbert's tortoiseshell butterfly (Aglais milberti)
Monarch butterfly (Danaus plexippus)
Mormon fritillary butterfly (Speyeria mormonia)
Mourning cloak butterfly (Nymphalis antiopa)
Mylitta crescent butterfly (Phyciodes mylitta)
Nokomis fritillary butterfly (Speyeria nokomis)
Northern checkerspot butterfly (Chlosyne palla)
Northern crescent butterfly (Phyciodes cocyta)
Northwestern fritillary butterfly (Speyeria hesperis)
Old World swallowtail butterfly (Papilio machaon)
Painted lady butterfly (Vanessa cardui)
Pale crescent butterfly (Phyciodes pallida)
Pale swallowtail butterfly (Papilio eurymedon)
Pallid crescentspot butterfly (Phyciodes picta)
Pearl crescent butterfly (Phyciodes tharos)
Pipevine swallowtail butterfly (Battus philenor)
Queen butterfly (Danaus gilippus)
Red admiral butterfly (Vanessa atalanta)
Red-spotted purple butterfly (Limenitis arthemis astyanax)
Relict fritillary butterfly (Boloria kriemhild)
Rockslide checkerspot butterfly (Chlosyne whitneyi)
Rocky Mountain parnassian butterfly (Parnassius smintheus)
Silver-bordered fritillary butterfly (Boloria selene)
Small white butterfly (Pieris rapae)
Soldier butterfly (Danaus eresimus)
Tropical buckeye butterfly (Junonia genoveva)
Two-tailed swallowtail butterfly (Papilio multicaudata)
Variable checkerspot butterfly (Euphydryas chalcedona)
Variegated cutworm (Peridroma saucia)
Variegated fritillary butterfly (Euptoieta claudia)
Viceroy butterfly (Limenitis archippus)
Weidemeyer's admiral butterfly (Limenitis weidemeyerii)
West Coast lady butterfly (Vanessa annabella)
Western bean cutworm (Striacosta albicosta)
Western tiger swallowtail butterfly (Papilio rutulus)
White admiral butterfly (Limenitis arthemis)
White peacock butterfly (Anartia jatrophae)
White-lined sphinx moth (Hyles lineata)
Zerene fritillary butterfly (Speyeria zerene)

Mollusks

Black gloss (Zonitoides nitidus)
California floater (Anodonta californiensis)
Desert springsnail (Pyrgulopsis deserta)
Fat-whorled pondsnail (Stagnicola bonnevillensis)
Fish Lake physa (Physella microstriata)
Glass physa (Physa skinneri)
Kanab ambersnail (Oxyloma kanabense)
Land snail (Nesovitrea electrina)
Minute gem (Hawaiia minuscula minuscula)
New Zealand mud snail (Potamopyrgus antipodarum) - not native and considered invasive
Ovate vertigo (Vertigo ovata)
Quagga mussel (Dreissena bugensis) - considered an invasive species, found in Lake Powell and suspected of being in Deer Creek Reservoir
Red-rimmed melania (Melanoides tuberculata) - not native and considered invasive
Southern tightcoil (Ogaridiscus subrupicola)
Striate gem (Hawaiia minuscula neomexicana)
Thickshell pondsnail (Stagnicola utahensis)
Thin-lip vallonia (Vallonia perspectiva)
Utah physa (Physella utahensis)
Utah roundmouth snail (Valvata utahensis)
Variable vertigo (Vertigo gouldii)
Western pearlshell (Margaritifera falcata)
Wet rock physa (Physella zionis)
Widespread column (or Moss chrysalis snail) (Pupilla muscorum)
Winged floater (Anodonta nuttalliana)

Other

House centipede (Scutigera coleoptrata)

Vertebrates

Amphibians

American bullfrog (Rana catesbeiana) - not a native species
Arizona toad (Bufo microscaphus)
Canyon tree frog (Hyla arenicolor)
Columbia spotted frog (Rana luteiventris) - on the Utah Sensitive Species List as a "conservation agreement species"
Great Basin spadefoot (Spea intermontana)
Great Plains toad (Bufo cognatus)
Green frog (Rana clamitans) - not a native species
New Mexico spadefoot toad (Spea multiplicata)
Northern leopard frog (Rana pipiens)
Pacific tree frog (Pseudacris regilla)
Plains spadefoot toad (Spea bombifrons)
Red-spotted toad (Bufo punctatus)
Relict leopard frog (Rana onca) - endangered, possibly extirpated from Utah
Tiger salamander (Ambystoma tigrinum) - the only native salamander species in Utah
Western chorus frog (Pseudacris triseriata)
Western toad (Bufo boreas)
Woodhouse's toad (Bufo woodhousii)

Birds

Acorn woodpecker (Melanerpes formicivorus)
Abert's towhee (Pipilo aberti)
American avocet (Recurvirostra americana)
American bittern (Botaurus lentiginosus)
American cliff swallow (Petrochelidon pyrrhonota)
American coot (Fulica americana)
American crow (Corvus brachyrhynchos)
American dipper (Cinclus mexicanus)
American golden plover (Pluvialis dominica)
American goldfinch (Carduelis tristis)
American kestral (Falco sparverius)
American pipit (Anthus rubescens) - also known as the buff-bellied pipit
American redstart (Setophaga ruticilla)
American robin (Turdus migratorius)
American three-toed woodpecker (Picoides dorsalis)
American tree sparrow (Spizella arborea)
American white pelican (Pelecanus erythrorhynchos)
American wigeon (Anas americana)
Ash-throated flycatcher (Myiarchus cinerascens)
Baird's sandpiper (Calidris bairdii)
Bald eagle (Haliaeetus leucocephalus)
Band-tailed pigeon (Patagioenas fasciata)
Bank swallow (Riparia riparia) - also called sand martin
Barn owl (Tyto alba)
Barn swallow (Hirundo rustica)
Barrow's goldeneye (Bucephala islandica)
Bell's vireo (Vireo bellii)
Belted kingfisher (Ceryle alcyon)
Bendire's thrasher (Toxostoma bendirei)
Bewick's wren (Thyromanes bewickii)
Black phoebe (Sayornis nigricans)
Black rosy finch (Leucosticte atrata)
Black swift (Cypseloides niger)
Black tern (Chlidonias niger)
Black-and-white warbler (Mniotilta varia) - rare, transitory
Black-bellied plover (Pluvialis squatarola)
Black-billed cuckoo (Coccyzus erythropthalmus)
Black-billed magpie (Pica hudsonia)
Black-capped chickadee (Poecile atricapillus)
Black-chinned hummingbird (Archilochus alexandri)
Black-chinned sparrow (Spizella atrogularis)
Black-crowned night heron (Nycticorax nycticorax)
Black-headed grosbeak (Pheucticus melanocephalus)
Black-necked stilt (Himantopus mexicanus)
Black-tailed gnatcatcher (Polioptila melanura)
Black-throated gray warbler (Dendroica nigrescens)
Black-throated sparrow (Amphispiza bilineata)
Blackpoll warbler (Dendroica striata) - rare, transitory
Blue jay (Cyanocitta cristata) - rare, mainly in winter
Blue-gray gnatcatcher (Polioptila caerulea)
Blue-winged teal (Anas discors)
Bobolink (Dolichonyx oryzivorus)
Bohemian waxwing (Bombycilla garrulus)
Bonaparte's gull (Larus philadelphia)
Boreal owl (Aegolius funereus)
Brewer's blackbird (Euphagus cyanocephalus)
Brewer's sparrow (Spizella breweri breweri)
Broad-tailed hummingbird (Selasphorus platycercus)
Broad-winged hawk (Buteo platypterus) - uncommon, mostly transitory
Brown creeper (Certhia americana)
Brown thrasher (Toxostoma rufum)
Brown-crested flycatcher (Myiarchus tyrannulus) - rare, transitory
Brown-headed cowbird (Molothrus ater)
Bufflehead (Bucephala albeola)
Bullock's oriole (Icterus bullockii)
Burrowing owl (Athene cunicularia)
Bushtit (Psaltriparus minimus)
Cackling goose (Branta hutchinsii)
Cactus wren (Campylorhynchus brunneicapillus)
California condor (Gymnogyps californianus) - endangered
California gull (Larus californicus) - often called seagull
California quail (Callipepla californica)
Calliope hummingbird (Selasphorus calliope) - formerly Stellula calliope
Canada goose (Branta canadensis)
Canvasback (Aythya valisineria)
Canyon wren (Catherpes mexicanus)
Caspian tern (Sterna caspia)
Cassin's finch (Carpodacus cassinii)
Cassin's kingbird (Tyrannus vociferans)
Cassin's vireo (Vireo cassinii)
Cedar waxwing (Bombycilla cedrorum)
Chipping sparrow (Spizella passerina)
Chukar partridge (Alectoris chukar)
Cinnamon teal (Anas cyanoptera)
Clark's grebe (Aechmophorus clarki)
Clark's nutcracker (Nucifraga columbiana)
Common black hawk (Buteogallus anthracinus)
Common goldeneye (Bucephala clangula)
Common grackle (Quiscalus qusicula)
Common loon (Gavia immer)
Common merganser (Mergus merganser)
Common moorhen (Gallinula chloropus)
Common nighthawk (Chordeiles minor)
Common poorwill (Phalaenoptilus nuttallii)
Common raven (Corvus corax)
Common redpoll (Carduelis flammea)
Common tern (Sterna hirundo)
Dusky grouse (Dendragapus obscurus) - sometimes called blue grouse
Long-billed dowitcher (Limnodromus scolopaceus)
Marbled godwit (Limosa fedoa)
Red-necked phalarope (Phalaropus lobatus)
Snowy plover (Charadrius nivosus)
Western cattle egret (Bubulcus ibis)
Western sandpiper (Calidris mauri)
Wilson's phalarope (Phalaropus tricolor)
Wood duck (Aix sponsa)

Fishes

Arctic grayling (Thymallus arcticus) - introduced fish, not native to Utah
Bear Lake sculpin (Cottus extensus) - listed as "vulnerable",  found only in Bear Lake
Bear Lake whitefish (Prosopium abyssicola) - found only in Bear Lake
Black bullhead (Ameiurus melas)
Black crappie (Pomoxis nigromaculatus)
Bluegill (Lepomis macrochirus) - introduced fish, not native to Utah
Bluehead sucker (Catostomus discobolus) - on the Utah Sensitive Species List
Bonneville cisco (Prosopium gemmifer) - found only in Bear Lake
Bonneville cutthroat trout (Oncorhynchus clarkii utah)
Bonneville whitefish (Prosopium spilonotus) - found only in Bear Lake
Bonytail chub (Gila elegans) - Federally listed as critically endangered
Brassy minnow (Hybognathus hankinsoni) - introduced fish, not native to Utah
Brook stickleback (Culaea inconstans) - introduced fish, not native to Utah
Brook trout (Salvelinus fontinalis) - introduced fish, not native to Utah
Brown trout (Salmo trutta) - introduced fish, not native to Utah
Burbot (Lota lota) - illegally introduced fish, not native to Utah
Channel catfish (Ictalurus punctatus) - introduced fish, not native to Utah
Colorado pikeminnow (Ptychocheilus lucius) - Federally listed as vulnerable
Colorado River cutthroat trout (Oncorhynchus clarkii pleuriticus)
Common carp (Cyprinus carpio) - introduced, invasive fish, not native to Utah
Cutthroat trout (Oncorhynchus clarkii)
June sucker (Chasmistes liorus)
Least chub (Iotichthys phlegethontis)
Utah Lake sculpin (Cottus echinatus) - extinct, last observed in the 1920s

Mammals

Abert's squirrel (Sciurus aberti)
Allen's big-eared bat (Idionycteris phyllotis)
American badger (Taxidea taxus)
American bison (Bos bison or Bison bison)
American black bear (Ursus americanus)
American ermine (Mustela richardsonii)
American marten (Martes americana)
American mink (Neogale vison)
American pika (Ochotona princeps)
American red squirrel (Tamiasciurus hudsonicus)
American water shrew (Sorex palustris)
Arizona woodrat (Neotoma devia)
Belding's ground squirrel (Spermophilus beldingi or Urocitellus beldingi)
Big brown bat (Eptesicus fuscus)
Big free-tailed bat (Nyctinomops macrotis)
Black rat (Rattus rattus)
Black-footed ferret (Mustela nigripes)
Black-tailed jackrabbit (Lepus californicus)
Bobcat (Lynx rufus)
Botta's pocket gopher (Thomomys bottae)
Brown bear (Ursus arctos) – extirpated
Brown rat (Rattus norvegicus)
Brush mouse (Peromyscus boylii)
Bushy-tailed woodrat (Neotoma cinerea)
Cactus mouse (Peromyscus eremicus)
California bighorn sheep (Ovis canadensis californiana)
California myotis (Myotis californicus)
Canada lynx (Lynx canadensis)
Canyon mouse (Peromyscus crinitus)
Chisel-toothed kangaroo rat (Dipodomys microps)
Cinereus shrew (Sorex cinereus)
Cliff chipmunk (Tamias dorsalis or Neotamias dorsalis)
Cougar (Puma concolor)
Coyote (Canis latrans)
Crawford's gray shrew (Notiosorex crawfordi)
Dark kangaroo mouse (Microdipodops megacephalus)
Desert bighorn sheep (Ovis canadensis nelsoni)
Desert cottontail (Sylvilagus audubonii)
Desert kangaroo rat (Dipodomys deserti)
Desert pocket mouse (Chaetodipus penicillatus)
Desert woodrat (Neotoma lepida)
Dwarf shrew (Sorex nanus)
Elk/Wapati (Cervus canadensis)
Fringed myotis (Myotis thysanodes)
Golden-mantled ground squirrel (Callospermophilus lateralis)
Gray fox (Urocyon cinereoargenteus)
Gray wolf (Canis lupus) – no confirmed mating pairs living in Utah, though there having been sitings in northeastern Utah along the Wyoming border
Great Basin pocket mouse (Perognathus parvus)
Hoary bat (Lasiurus cinereus)
House mouse (Mus musculus)
Kit fox (Vulpes macrotis)
Least chipmunk (Tamias minimus)
Little brown bat (Myotis lucifugus)
Long-eared myotis (Myotis evotis)
Long-legged myotis (Myotis volans)
Long-tailed vole (Microtus longicaudus)
Long-tailed weasel (Neogale frenata)
Meadow vole (Microtus pennsylvanicus)
Mexican free-tailed bat (Tadarida brasiliensis)
Montane shrew (Sorex monticolus)
Montane vole (Microtus montanus)
Moose (Alces alces)
Mountain cottontail (Sylvilagus nuttallii)
Mountain goat (Oreamnos americanus)
Mule deer (Odocoileus hemionus)
Muskrat (Ondatra zibethicus)
North American beaver (Castor canadensis)
North American deer mouse (Peromyscus maniculatus)
North American porcupine (Erethizon dorsatum)
North American river otter (Lontra canadensis)
Northern flying squirrel (Glaucomys sabrinus)
Northern grasshopper mouse (Onychomys leucogaster)
Northern pocket gopher (Thomomys talpoides)
Ord's kangaroo rat (Dipodomys ordii)
Pinyon mouse (Peromyscus truei)
Piute ground squirrel (Urocitellus mollis)
Pronghorn (Antilocapra americana)
Raccoon (Procyon lotor)
Red deer (Cervus elaphus)
Red fox (Vulpes vulpes)
Ring-tailed cat (Bassariscus astutus)
Rock squirrel (Otospermophilus variegatus)
Rocky Mountain bighorn sheep (Ovis canadensis canadensis)
Silver-haired bat (Lasionycteris noctivagans)
Snowshoe hare (Lepus americanus)
Southern red-backed vole (Clethrionomys gapperi)
Spotted bat (Euderma maculatum)
Striped skunk (Mephitis mephitis)
Townsend's big-eared bat (Corynorhinus townsendii)
Uinta chipmunk (Tamias umbrinus)
Uinta ground squirrel (Urocitellus armatus)
Vagrant shrew (Sorex vagrans)
Water vole (Microtus richardsoni)
Western harvest mouse (Reithrodontomys megalotis)
Western heather vole (Phenacomys intermedius)
Western jumping mouse (Zapus princeps)
Western small-footed bat (Myotis ciliolabrum)
Western spotted skunk (Spilogale gracilis)
White-tailed antelope squirrel (Ammospermophilus leucurus)
White-tailed deer (Odocoileus virginianus)
White-tailed jackrabbit (Lepus townsendii)
Wolverine (Gulo gulo)
Yellow-bellied marmot (Marmota flaviventris)

Reptiles

Blackneck garter snake (Thamnophis cyrtopsis)
Coachwhip (Masticophis flagellum)
Common chuckwalla (Sauromalus ater)
Common kingsnake (Lampropeltis getula)
Common side-blotched lizard (Uta stansburiana)
Corn snake (Pantherophis guttatus or Elaphe guttata)
Desert horned lizard / "horny toad" (Phrynosoma platyrhinos)
Desert iguana (Dipsosaurus dorsalis)
Desert night lizard (Xantusia vigilis)
Desert spiny lizard (Sceloporus magister)
Desert tortoise / "Mojave desert tortoise" (Gopherus agassizii)
Eastern collared lizard (Crotaphytus collaris)
Eastern fence lizard (Sceloporus undulatus)
Eastern racer (Coluber constrictor)
Gila monster (Heloderma suspectum)
Glossy snake
A. e. eburnata
A. e. philipi
Gopher snake (Pituophis catenifer)
P. c. deserticola
P. c. sayi ("bullsnake")
Great Basin collared lizard (Crotaphytus bicinctores)
Great Basin rattlesnake (Crotalus oreganus lutosus or Crotalus lutosus)
Greater short-horned lizard / "Horny toad" (Phrynosoma hernandesi)
Hopi rattlesnake (Crotalus viridis nuntius)
Lesser earless lizard (Holbrookia maculata)
Long-nosed leopard lizard (Gambelia wislizenii)
Long-nosed snake (Rhinocheilus lecontei)
Many-lined skink (Plestiodon multivirgatus)
Midget faded rattlesnake (Crotalus oreganus concolor)
Milk snake (Lampropeltis triangulum)
Mojave rattlesnake (Crotalus scutulatus)
New Mexico whiptail (Aspidoscelis neomexicanus)
Night snake (Hypsiglena torquata)
Ornate tree lizard (Urosaurus ornatus)
Painted turtle (Chrysemys picta)
Plateau striped whiptail (Aspidoscelis velox)
Prairie rattlesnake (Crotalus viridis viridis)
Ring-necked snake (Diadophis punctatus)
Rubber boa (Charina bottae)
Sagebrush lizard (Sceloporus graciosus)
Sidewinder (Crotalus cerastes)
Smith's black-headed snake (Tantilla hobartsmithi)
Smooth green snake (Opheodrys vernalis)
Snapping turtle (Chelydra serpentina) – not native, confirmed near St. George
Sonoran mountain kingsnake (Lampropeltis pyromelana)
Speckled rattlesnake (Crotalus mitchellii)
Spiny softshell turtle (Apalone spinifera)
Spotted leaf-nosed snake (Phyllorhynchus decurtatus)
Striped whipsnake (Masticophis taeniatus)
Valley garter snake (Thamnophis sirtalis fitchi)
Western banded gecko (Coleonyx variegatus)
Western fence lizard (Sceloporus occidentalis)
Western ground snake (Sonora semiannulata)
Western lyre snake (Trimorphodon biscutatus)
Western patch-nosed snake (Salvadora hexalepis)
Western skink (Eumeces skiltonianus or Plestiodon skiltonianus)
Western terrestrial garter snake (Thamnophis elegans)
Western threadsnake (Leptotyphlops humilis or Rena humilis)
Western whiptail (Aspidoscelis tigris)
Zebra-tailed lizard (Callisaurus draconoides)

References